Samdari is a city and tehsil headquarters in Barmer district in Rajasthan, northern India.

Demographics
According to the Indian Census 2011, the population of Samdari is 22222, where male population is 12805 and female population is 12207.

Notable people
Goparam Meghwal, Member of the Legislative Assembly

See also 
 Dheedhas
 Samdari Junction railway station
 Balotra

References 

 Samdari Coordinates

Villages in Barmer district
Tehsils of Barmer district